The Green Anarchist, established in 1984 in the UK, was a magazine advocating green anarchism.

Early years
Founded after the 1984 Stop the City protests, the  magazine was launched in the summer of that year by an editorial collective consisting of Alan Albon, Richard Hunt and Marcus Christo. Albon had been an editor of Freedom whilst Hunt had become frustrated with the more mainstream green magazine Green Line for which he had been writing. The younger Christo had come from a more anarcho-punk background – he was also a member of Green CND, and had been involved in the blockade of Ronald Reagan's car at the 1984 Lancaster House summit meeting.

Early issues featured a range of broadly anarchist and ecological ideas, bringing together groups and individuals as varied as Class War, veteran anarchist writer Colin Ward, anarcho-punk band Crass, as well as the Peace Convoy, anti-nuclear campaigners, animal rights activists and so on. However the diversity that many saw as the publication's greatest strength quickly led to irreconcilable arguments between the essentially pacifist approach of Albon and Christo, and the advocacy of violent confrontation with the State favoured by Hunt.

Albon and Christo left Green Anarchist shortly afterwards, and the magazine saw a succession of editorial collectives, although Hunt remained in overall control. During this period he published articles which were increasingly alienating much of the magazine's readership. Matters came to a head after Hunt wrote an editorial which expressed support for British troops in the Gulf War and extolled the virtues of patriotism. Hunt has stated that the rest of the editorial collective wished to bring to Green Anarchist a more left-wing political approach, while Hunt wanted it to remain non-aligned. Shortly afterwards he left to start another magazine Alternative Green, which continued to promote his own particular view of green anarchism, and eventually became closely linked to the National-Anarchist movement from the mid-90s onwards.

The Nineties
During the 1990s Green Anarchist came under the helm of an editorial collective that included Paul Rogers, Steve Booth and others, during which period the publication became increasingly aligned with primitivism, an anti-civilization philosophy advocated by writers such as John Zerzan, Bob Black and Fredy Perlman.

During this period the magazine expressed sympathy for the criminal activities of Ted Kaczynski and published a notorious article entitled "The Irrationalists" that supported actions like the Oklahoma City bombing and the sarin gas attacks carried out by the Tokyo based Aum cult. This once again alienated much of the UK anarchist movement, and led to strong criticism of the magazine by Stewart Home, Counter Information, the Anarchist Communist Federation and others. Steven Booth, the writer of the article, has since renounced the views expressed in it, as well as the primitivist movement altogether.

The GANDALF trial

Starting in 1995, Hampshire Police began a series of at least 56 raids, code named 'Operation Washington', that eventually resulted in the August to November 1997 Portsmouth trial of Green Anarchist editors Booth, Saxon Wood, Noel Molland and Paul Rogers, as well as Animal Liberation Front (ALF) Press Officer Robin Webb and Animal Liberation Front Supporters Group (ALFSG) newsletter editor Simon Russell. The defendants organised the GANDALF Defence campaign. Three of the editors of Green Anarchist, Noel Molland, Saxon Wood and Booth were jailed for 'conspiracy to incite'. However, all three were shortly afterwards released on appeal.

Booth and Rogers' Green Anarchists
In the late 1990s there was a further split amongst the GA collective, leading to the existence of two entirely separate magazines using the Green Anarchist title. These are respectively published by an editorial team that includes Paul Rogers and 'John Connor' (who subtitle their version of the paper as the original and best), and Steve Booth, who has publicly renounced some of his earlier published views and expressed a wish to 'return to the magazine's roots'.

See also
 Green Anarchy

References

External links
 Archived
 Critical articles about Green Anarchist at Libcom

1984 establishments in the United Kingdom
Anarchist organisations in the United Kingdom
Anarchist periodicals published in the United Kingdom
Political magazines published in the United Kingdom
DIY culture
Green anarchism
Magazines established in 1984